Michael John Trgovac (born February 27, 1959) is an American football coach and a former player who is a senior defensive assistant for the Las Vegas Raiders of the National Football League (NFL). He previously served as the defensive line coach for the Green Bay Packers, Carolina Panthers, Washington Redskins, and Philadelphia Eagles. Trgovac was a member of the Packers' coaching staff that led the team to the NFL championship in Super Bowl XLV in 2011. Born in Youngstown, Ohio, Trgovac played college football as a middle guard for the University of Michigan from 1977 to 1980. He received All-Big Ten Conference honors in both 1979 and 1980.  After graduating from Michigan, Trgovac held various college coaching positions from 1984 to 1994.

Early years
Trgovac was born in Youngstown, Ohio, in 1958.  He became an all-state defensive lineman at Fitch High School in Austintown, Ohio. He was named defensive lineman of the year in 1976 and also won the state wrestling title. He is of Serbian ancestry and his surname means "Trader" in the Serbian language.

Playing career
Trgovac enrolled at the University of Michigan in 1977 and played college football at the middle guard position for Bo Schembechler's Michigan Wolverines football teams from 1977 to 1980. As a sophomore in 1978, he started six games for the Wolverines and received the John F. Maulbetsch Award (presented to a football underclassman for desire, character, capacity for leadership and future success both on and off the football field).

As a junior, Trgovac started 11 games at middle guard for the 1979 Michigan team, won the Frederick Matthei Award, and was selected as a first-team player on the 1979 All-Big Ten Conference football team.

As a senior, Trgovac again started 11 of 12 games at middle guard for the 1980 Michigan Wolverines football team that compiled a 10-2 record, finished #4 in the AP and UPI polls, and outscored opponents 322 to 129.  Trgovac was selected as a first-team All-Big Ten player for the second consecutive year.

Coaching career

College
Following his graduation from Michigan, Trgovac became a graduate assistant under Schembechler in the 1984 and 1985 seasons with fellow GAs Cam Cameron and Bill Sheridan. From 1986 to 1988 he coached the defensive line at Ball State. Following a one-year stint with Navy, he joined former Ohio State coach Earle Bruce's staff at Colorado State as defensive line coach. He ended his college coaching career with three seasons on Lou Holtz's staff at Notre Dame.

Philadelphia Eagles
Trgovac served as the defensive line coach for the Philadelphia Eagles from 1995–1998. In 1998, the Eagles finished third in the NFL in sack percentage and first overall against the pass. Trgovac's 1995 line recorded an NFL-best 42.5 sacks.

Green Bay Packers
Trgovac was hired as a defensive line coach by the Green Bay Packers. He only spent one season with them.

Washington Redskins
In 2000, Trgovac was hired by the Washington Redskins. He served as their defensive line coach for two seasons. He helped guide a Redskins defense that ranked fourth in the NFL and first in the NFC in 2000.

Carolina Panthers
Following the 2001 season, Trgovac joined the Carolina Panthers. He was promoted to defensive coordinator for the 2003 season. Since Trgovac joined Carolina in 2002, the Panthers rank fifth in total yards allowed, trailing only  the Tampa Bay Buccaneers, Pittsburgh Steelers, Baltimore Ravens and Denver Broncos. They were also sixth in first downs allowed and rushing yards allowed per attempt, ninth in rushing yards allowed per game and 10th in third down efficiency. After turning down a contract offer from the Panthers, Trgovac informed Head Coach John Fox and General Manager Marty Hurney that he was leaving the team.

Return to Green Bay
In 2009, Trgovac returned to the Green Bay Packers as their defensive line coach. He was let go along with several other Green Bay defensive assistants following the 2017 season.

Oakland / Las Vegas Raiders
On January 18, 2018, Trgovac was hired by the Oakland Raiders as their defensive line coach. In January 2019, it was announced that he had been replaced by Brentson Buckner. Subsequently, Trgovac became the Raiders' senior defensive assistant.

References

External links

1959 births
Living people
Carolina Panthers coaches
Green Bay Packers coaches
Michigan Wolverines football coaches
Michigan Wolverines football players
National Football League defensive coordinators
Notre Dame Fighting Irish football coaches
Washington Redskins coaches
Philadelphia Eagles coaches
Ball State Cardinals football coaches
Players of American football from Youngstown, Ohio
Navy Midshipmen football coaches
Colorado State Rams football coaches
American people of Serbian descent
Oakland Raiders coaches
Las Vegas Raiders coaches